Nazis: The Occult Conspiracy is an American television documentary film about Nazi occultism. It first aired in 1998 on the Discovery Channel. The documentary was directed by Tracy Atkinson and Joan Baran, narrated by Malcolm McDowell.

Soundtrack
The film discusses Wagner's opera Parsifal while the soundtrack plays the "Funeral March" from Götterdämmerung.

Television and DVD release
The documentary was originally shown on television and subsequently released on VHS in the USA on April 6, 1999, by the BMG Distribution and in the UK on 20 Jan 2003 by the Lace International Ltd studio. The running time is 90 minutes.

In Italy the documentary was released on DVD under the title Nazismo: La Cospirazione Occulta in 2003 by Medusa Video.

In Germany the documentary was released on DVD under the title Nazis: Die okkulte Verschwörung on 8 November 2005 by M.I.B. – Medienvertrieb in Buchholz. The documentary was also shown on TV in a shortened version called Hitlers Mystiker.

See also
 Ostara (magazine)

Places
 Externsteine
 Montségur
 Wewelsburg

People

References

External links
 
 

American documentary television films
Discovery Channel original programming
1998 television films
1998 films
Documentary films about World War II
Documentary films about Adolf Hitler
Occultism in Nazism
1990s English-language films